Eresina maesseni, the Maessen's eresina, is a butterfly in the family Lycaenidae. It is found in Senegal, Guinea-Bissau, Guinea, Sierra Leone, Ivory Coast, Ghana, southern Nigeria and Cameroon. Its habitat consists of dense, primary forests, including wet and drier forests.

References

Butterflies described in 1956
Poritiinae